Jessica Beard (born January 8, 1989) is an American sprinter who qualified for the 2009 IAAF World Championships in the 4x400-meter relay and 400 meters. She won the gold medal with the relay team. She also was fifth in the 400 m at the 2006 World Junior Championships in Athletics and improved to win the silver medal at the 2008 World Junior Championships.

High school and college
In high school, she was a four-year letter winner for the Euclid High School track and field squad.  She was state champion in the 400 meters for four straight years setting a new Ohio state record in 2007. She decided to go to Texas A&M on a track scholarship the following year.

As a freshman, she got off to a fast start by placing fourth in the 400 meters at the NCAA Championships.  Jessica also became the Big 12 Champion in the 400-meter dash, running her personal best time of 51.09 seconds and she was voted Big 12 freshman of the year.

During her second year, she continued her success winning both the indoor and outdoor Big 12 title in the 400 meters and finished second in the 400 m at the NCAA Championships.  Jessica set a new school record with a time of 50.56 that year.

Elite competition
Competing at the national level, in her 2009 track season Beard placed third in the 400 m at the USA Outdoor Track and Field Championships in Eugene, Oregon.  That qualified her for the World Championships taking place in Berlin, Germany later that year.  At the championships Beard placed 13th overall in the women's 400 m and took home the gold as part of the 4 × 400 m relay.

References

External links

1989 births
Living people
American female sprinters
People from Euclid, Ohio
Sportspeople from Cuyahoga County, Ohio
Texas A&M Aggies women's track and field athletes
Track and field athletes from Ohio
World Athletics Championships winners
World Athletics Championships athletes for the United States
World Athletics Championships medalists
World record holders in athletics (track and field)
20th-century American women
21st-century American women